Hasanabad-e Abu ol Hasani (also Romanized as Ḩasanābād-e Abū ol Ḩasanī and Ḩasanābād-e Abowlḩasanī; also known as Abowl Ḩasanī and Abū ol Ḩasanī) is a village in Jereh Rural District, Jereh and Baladeh District, Kazerun County, Fars Province, Iran. At the 2006 census, its population was 610, in 133 families.

References 

Populated places in Kazerun County